Graham Jones (born 5 October 1957) is an English former professional footballer who played as a defender.

Career
Born in Bradford, Jones signed for Bradford City in February 1974 after playing local amateur football, leaving the club in July 1979 to sign for Gainsborough Trinity. During his time with Bradford City he made four appearances in the Football League.

Sources

References

1957 births
Living people
English footballers
Bradford City A.F.C. players
Gainsborough Trinity F.C. players
English Football League players
Association football defenders